The 19th AVN Awards ceremony, presented by Adult Video News (AVN), took place January 11, 2002 at the Venetian Hotel Grand Ballroom, at Paradise, Nevada, U.S.A. During the ceremony, AVN presented AVN Awards in more than 80 categories honoring the best pornographic films released between Oct. 1, 2000 and Sept. 30, 2001. The ceremony was produced by Gary Miller and directed by Mark Stone. Comedian Bobby Slayton hosted the show for the third time; his co-host was adult film star Teri Weigel.

Fade to Black won eight awards including Best Film and Best Director—Film for Paul Thomas. Other winners included Euphoria with seven trophies, Island Fever with three and numerous movies with two wins apiece.

Winners and nominees 

The nominees for the 19th AVN Awards were announced on November 9, 2002. Taboo 2001 and Underworld tied for the most nominations with 12 each, followed by Bad Wives 2, Fade to Black and Taken which each received 11. Euphoria followed with nine and Beast, Marissa and Unreal had eight apiece.

The winners were announced during the awards ceremony on January 11, 2002. Paul Thomas's win for Best Director—Film was his third; he won previously for Justine (1993) and Bobby Sox (1996). Nikita Denise was first European actress to win Female Performer of the Year.

Major awards

Winners are listed first, highlighted in boldface, and indicated with a double dagger.

Additional Award Winners 
These awards were announced, but not presented, in two pre-recorded winners-only segments shown on the ballroom's video monitors during the event. Trophies were given to the recipients off-stage:

 Adult Video Nudes: The Amazing Ty 19: Peehole Gangbang
 Best All-Girl Feature: The Violation of Kate Frost
 Best All-Girl Series: The Violation Of...
 Best All-Girl Sex Scene—Film: Raylene, April, Ryan Conner, Bobby Vitale, Eric Price, Erik Everhard, Randy Spears (Jail cell group), Bad Wives 2
 Best All-Sex DVD: Porno Vision
 Best All-Sex Film: Porno Vision
 Best Alternative Video: Wild Party Girls 2
 Best Anal Sex Scene—Video: Janice, Alberto Rey, David Perry, Frank Gun,[Leslie Taylor, Robert Ribot, Rocco: Animal Trainer 5
 Best Anal-Themed Series: Rocco's True Anal Stories
 Best Anal-Themed Feature: Heavy Metal 1
 Best Art Direction—Film: Andrew Blake, Blond & Brunettes
 Best Art Direction—Video: Britt Morgan, Wonderland
 Best Box Cover Concept: Unreal, VCA Pictures
 Best Cinematography: Andrew Blake, Blond & Brunettes
 Best Classic Release on DVD: The Opening of Misty Beethoven, VCA Interactive
 Best Continuing Video Series: Rocco: Animal Trainer
 Best Couples Sex Scene—Video: Kelly Stafford, Rocco Siffredi, Rocco's Way To Love
 Best Director—Foreign Release: Kovi, The Splendor of Hell
 Best DVD Authoring: VCA Interactive
 Best DVD Extras: Dark Angels: Special Edition, Digital Sin
 Best DVD Menus: Cool Devices, Nu-Tech Digital
 Best DVD Packaging: The Gate, Wicked Pictures DVD
 Best Editing—Film: Tommy Ganz, Fade to Black
 Best Editing—Video: Sydney Michaels, Island Fever
 Best Ethnic-Themed Series: Chica Boom
 Best Ethnic-Themed Video: Freakazoids
 Best Foreign Release: Christoph's Beautiful Girls
 Best Foreign Vignette Series: Euro Angels Hardball
 Best Foreign Vignette Tape: The Splendor of Hell
 Best Gonzo Series: Buttman
 Best Group Sex Scene—Film: Taylor Hayes, Taylor St. Claire, Dale DaBone, Fade To Black
 Best Group Sex Scene—Video: Ava Vincent, Bridgette Kerkove, Nikita Denise, Herschel Savage, Trevor, Succubus
 Best Interactive DVD: Virtual Sex with Devon
 Best Music: Tha Eastsidaz, Others, Snoop Dogg's Doggystyle
 Best Non-Sex Performance—Film or Video: Paul Thomas, Fade to Black
 Best Oral-Themed Feature: Shut Up & Blow Me! 25
 Best Oral-Themed Series: Shut Up & Blow Me!
 Best Overall Marketing Campaign—Company Image: Digital Playground
 Best Overall Marketing Campaign—Individual Title or Series: Taboo 2001, Metro Studios
 Best Packaging: Beautiful/Nasty, Wicked Pictures
 Best Pro-Am or Amateur Series: Cherries, Up and Cummers (tie)
 Best Pro-Am or Amateur Tape: The Real Naturals 1 Best Screenplay—Film: Dean Nash, Fade to Black Best Screenplay—Video: David Aaron Clark, Brad Armstrong, Euphoria Best Sex Scene in a Foreign Release: Amanda Angel, Katherine Count, guys in masks, Rocco: Animal Trainer 4 
 Best Solo Sex Scene: Kim Chambers, Edge Play Best Special Effects: Dick Roundtree, Euphoria 
 Best Specialty Tape—Big Bust: Pussyman's Big Tit Paradise Best Specialty Tape—Bondage & S/M: Virgin Kink 19 Best Specialty Tape—Other Genre: Barefoot Confidential 13 Best Specialty Tape—Spanking: Stocking Strippers Spanked Best Tease Performance: Tera Patrick, Island Fever Best Transsexual Tape: Rogue Adventures 13 Best Videography: Jake Jacobs, Perry Tratt, Euphoria Best Vignette Series: Grrl Power! Best Vignette Tape: Grrl Power! 5 The Hot Video Award (Best American Release in France): Dark Angels Most Outrageous Sex Scene: Kristen Kane, Herschel Savage, Rafe in "Pussy Face", Perverted Stories 31 Honorary AVN Awards 

Reuben Sturman Award
 Gloria Leonard, Elyse Metcalf

Hall of Fame
AVN Hall of Fame inductees for 2002 were: Christoph Clark, Patrick Collins, Raquel Darrian, Samantha Fox, Janine Lindemulder, Missy, Michael Ninn, Rocco Siffredi, P. J. Sparxxx, Randy Spears, Tianna

Multiple nominations and awards

The following releases received the most nominations.

 The following 17 releases received multiple awards:

Presenters and performers

The following individuals, listed in order of appearance, presented awards or performed musical numbers, comedy or tributes. The show's trophy girls were Carmen Luvana and Monique Alexander.

 Presenters  (in order of appearance) 

Performers

 Ceremony information 

The awards show was held on the four-month anniversary of New York and Washington terrorist attacks and as such, began with a pre-recorded video tribute to post 9/11 U.S.A. featuring industry stars offering personal tributes to the country.

The show was not without its share of controversies. To keep the length of the show as short as possible by limiting the number of awards presented on stage, about 50 of the awards split into two groupings are announced in rapid succession on a screen with awards handed out later. In the first of these groupings the announcements were made by the animated characters of 2 Funky 4 U, a forthcoming animated feature by Private North America. However, some of the animated characters "offended some audience members as being allegedly racist."

Later, Snoop Dogg generated excitement by appearing on stage to accept the award for Best Selling Tape of 2001. After returning to his seat he was thronged by about 100 fans eager to meet or congratulate him, obstructing the view of people sitting behind, although the crowd did disperse without incident.

Then AVN publisher Paul Fishbein went on stage to present the Reuben Sturman Memorial Special Achievement Award to Cincinnati retailer Elyse Metcalf. Fishbein gave a recap of her high-profile obscenity trial and acquittal in the previous year but Metcalf gave the show an awkward moment because she was not there to accept the honor. Metcalf had left earlier "after becoming upset over remarks made to her by a financial supporter."

The show was recorded for later broadcast and a video of the awards show was issued by VCA Pictures.

Performance of year's moviesSnoop Dogg's Doggystyle was announced as the adult movie industry's top selling movie and Island Fever'' was the top renting movie of the previous year.

In Memoriam

John Leslie and Joey Silvera ended the show by asking for a moment of silence in memory of late director Alex de Renzy who had died in 2001.

See also

 AVN Award
 AVN Best New Starlet Award
 AVN Award for Male Performer of the Year
 AVN Award for Male Foreign Performer of the Year
 AVN Female Performer of the Year Award
 List of members of the AVN Hall of Fame
 2002 GayVN Awards

Notes

References

External links

 
2002 AVN Award nominees (archived at Wayback Machine, December 8, 2001)
 2002 AVN Award Winners (archived at Wayback Machine, December 9, 2002)
 Adult Video News Awards  at the Internet Movie Database
 
 
 

AVN Awards
2001 film awards